Nola is an unincorporated community in Scott County, in the U.S. state of Arkansas.

History
A post office called Nola was established in 1907, and remained in operation until 1959. The community perhaps is named after Nola Kelley, the daughter of a local resident.

References

Unincorporated communities in Arkansas
Unincorporated communities in Scott County, Arkansas